Mengellang is a village in Palau and the capital of the state of Ngarchelong.

Populated places in Palau
Ngarchelong